Göppingen station is a station in the town of Göppingen in the German state of Baden-Württemberg. It is a transit station and is situated km 42.1 from Stuttgart  on the Fils Valley Railway, which was completed in 1850 from Stuttgart to Ulm.

Location 
The station is located on the southern edge of the inner city of Göppingen. To its east are large marshalling and freight yards, which are still used occasionally. To its west is a smaller disused freight yard with loading docks and the central bus station.

Station layout 
The station consists of an entrance building, which houses a restaurant, two kiosks, a bakery, a bookstore and a travel centre. The former baggage and express freight facility is not used anymore.

It has seven platform tracks, tracks 1 to 7. Only tracks 4 and 6 are regularly used for passenger trains. Only a few regional trains run on tracks 1 and 3. Platform track 5 is used once a day by a City Night Line train from Paris, continuing to Munich.

Track 1 was used until 1986, for traffic on the disused Hohenstaufen Railway (Hohenstaufenbahn) to Schwäbisch Gmünd. Track 7 was used for traffic of the disused Voralb Railway (Voralbbahn) to Boll (passenger service closed on 27 May 1989 and it closed completely on 15 December 1997). In addition, at the eastern end of the platform that serves tracks 6 and 7 there is a dock platform, which formerly bore the number 13, and was used by most of the trains on the Voralb Railway.

The sprawling marshalling yard is now closed, although part of it near the station is used by the construction company Leonhard Weiss. All the other industrial sidings are closed. Similarly, the container terminal, which in the first years of the 1970s was one of the most modern facilities of its kind, was closed down in the mid 1990s.

History
The station was first opened on 11 October 1847 when the Fils Valley Railway (Filstalbahn) reached Göppingen, the line was completed to Ulm in 1850.

On 6 April 1893, the plans for the extension of the main building was approved and then executed. Between 1914 and 1917, the station was expanded and rebuilt again to handle traffic on the new Hohenstaufen Railway to Schwäbisch Gmünd and the then projected Voralb Railway to Boll.

During the Second World War an air raid shelter for 80 people was built in the station forecourt.

On 27 May 1964 today's station building, designed by Hellmut Kasel, was opened on schedule after two years of construction. In the late 1960s, a new freight terminal building was built, but it is no longer used.

Rail services

Long distance 
Some InterCity and EuroCity services operate on several lines, using the Stuttgart–Ulm line and stopping at Göppingen station. Moreover, there is a once a day direct connection to Paris on the City Night Line.

Regional services
Göppingen is served hourly by Regional-Express services between Stuttgart to Ulm and every two-hours by Interregio-Express services between Stuttgart and Lindau. Between Plochingen and Geislingen an der Steige hourly Regionalbahn services also stop in Göppingen.

Notes

External links 
 

Railway stations in Baden-Württemberg
Railway stations in Germany opened in 1847
Buildings and structures in Göppingen (district)